FK OEZ Letohrad is a football club located in Letohrad, Czech Republic. It currently plays in Divize C, which is in the Czech Fourth Division.

The club was promoted from the Czech Fourth Division in 2011.

References

External links
  

Football clubs in the Czech Republic
Association football clubs established in 1919